Odontolabis lowei is a species of beetles belonging to the family Lucanidae.

Description

Distribution 
This species can be found in Borneo, Sumatra and Java.

References 

 Biolib
 Universal Biological Indexer
 Hallan, Joel Synopsis of the described Coleoptera of the World

External links 
 Odontolabis lowei on Web.me
 World Field Guide

lowei
Beetles described in 1873
Invertebrates of Borneo